Tancancocha (possibly from Quechua tanka fork, a deep bifurcation, -n a suffix, qucha lake, "lake of the bifurcation") is a mountain in the north of the  Huallanca mountain range in the Andes of Peru at a small lake of that name. It is located in the Ancash Region, Bolognesi Province, in the districts of Aquia and Huallanca. 

References 

Mountains of Peru
Mountains of Ancash Region
Lakes of Peru
Lakes of Ancash Region